KQMA is an FM radio station broadcasting on 92.5 FM from Phillipsburg, Kansas. The station began service on July 14, 1984, and was founded by Brian O'Neill. The station is currently owned and operated by RTY Broadcasting, broadcasting a Variety/Full-Service format. Playing a mix of Classic Rock, Oldies, Contemporary and Today's Hot New Country, as well as an assortment of other local programming.

External links

QMA
Full service radio stations in the United States